The list of ship launches in 1740 includes a chronological list of some ships launched in 1740.


References

1740
Ship launches